Saferworld is an international non-governmental organisation with conflict prevention and peacebuilding programmes in over 20 countries and territories in the Horn of Africa, the African Great Lakes region, Asia, the Middle East, Central Asia and the Caucasus. It was founded in Bristol, UK in 1989 and now has its main office in London.

Much of Saferworld's work includes obtaining research and conducting specific analyses on current conflicts. One of the main objectives of the organisation is to enhance the power and influence of individuals, by encouraging vocalisation of grievances and social injustices. Saferworld achieves this through careful analysis of conflicts and arranging sit-down discussions between stakeholders.

Saferworld addresses many community-based issues through in-depth analysis and objective examination. One of the organisation’s strengths is its ability to delve into conflicts, rather than scraping the surface and gauging assistance on an underdeveloped perspective. Saferworld also takes special interest in understanding how conflicts affect women, children, and other demographics.

History 
Saferworld was founded in 1989 in Bristol, UK. After changing its name from the Nuclear Freeze Campaign to Saferworld, its focus moved from nuclear weapons proliferation to campaigning for more effective controls on the proliferation and misuse of conventional arms. This included advocating for an EU Code of Conduct on Arms Exports, and involvement in the first discussions about what is now known as the Arms Trade Treaty.

In the 1990s, Saferworld began looking at the broader elements of conflict such as governance, power, marginalisation, access to resources, and development. Saferworld moved from Bristol to London in 1995, and a grant from the UK Department for International Development in 2000 enabled it to expand its work to start in-country programming.

In 2010 Saferworld started programmes in the Middle East and North Africa, including Yemen, and developed an increasing focus on cross-border and regional conflict.

Saferworld's work

Mission 
Saferworld’s mission is to prevent violent conflict and build safer lives, and create environments where:
 people play an active role in preventing and transforming conflict and building peace
 people have access to fair and effective paths to address the grievances and inequalities that drive conflict
 people with influence exercise power to promote just and equitable societies

Community security approach 
Saferworld's community security approach aims to respond to people's perceptions of insecurity and conflict by improving relationships between community members and their security providers, such as the police. It was developed by working directly with people living in conflict-affected contexts.

Regional programmes

Africa 
Saferworld has programmes in Kenya, Somalia/Somaliland, South Sudan, Sudan and Uganda focusing on topics such as community security, arms control, policing, and conflict sensitivity.

Asia 
Saferworld works to create safer communities in Bangladesh, Myanmar, Nepal and Pakistan. Saferworld also has a China programme involving work with policymakers, academics and commercial actors to ensure China contributes positively to conflict prevention.

Europe and Central Asia 
Saferworld has been active in the Caucasus since 1999 to support a people-centred approach to analysing and responding to conflict. The organisation works on Armenia, Azerbaijan and Georgia, including disputed or unrecognised territories such as Nagorno-Karabakh, South Ossetia and Abkhazia.

Central Asia is also a focus region for Saferworld. It works in the Ferghana Valley, specifically in Kyrgyzstan and Tajikistan, to improve people’s security by working with the police and local communities.

Middle East and North Africa 
Egypt, Libya and Yemen are Saferworld’s focus countries in the Middle East and North Africa. The focus in Egypt is on improving the responsiveness, conflict sensitivity, gender sensitivity and accountability of security and governance providers. In Libya it works on improving people’s security and supporting Libyan civil society in peacebuilding.

Saferworld’s Yemen programme aims to promote inclusive and accountable peacebuilding and governance. Saferworld continues to work with communities in Yemen affected by Yemen's Civil War and the ongoing humanitarian crisis.

Thematic work 
Saferworld works on a number of issues in conflict prevention.

Arms 
Saferworld was one of the dominant civil society actors campaigning for stronger arms controls and the enactment of the Arms Trade Treaty and is part of the Control Arms coalition.

Saferworld is addressing the issue of global arms transfers and the rising number of small arms and light weapons. Its work on arms transfers can be divided into:
 Arms Trade Treaty
 Arms transfers in Europe
 UK arms transfer controls
 Small arms and light weapons

Gender, peace and security 
Saferworld works on gender, peace and security issues such as violence against women and understanding the roles of women and men in preventing and perpetuating conflict. The organisation also provides input into policies on conflict, such as UNSCR 1325.

Security and justice 
Saferworld works to promote security and justice systems that are effective, accountable and responsive to the needs of the most vulnerable in society, working with governments on security sector reform programmes. It also works towards improving community security in several countries by building trust between the police and communities and promoting joint action to improve their safety and security. The organisation's 10 year strategy (2021-2031) also "commits to working with partners on ensuring that climate change adaptation and mitigation strategies take peace and conflict dynamics into account".

2030 Agenda 
Saferworld has been working to ensure the inclusion of peaceful and inclusive societies within the Sustainable Development Goals (SDGs). It is now focusing on making sure that the targets and indicators within the SDGs – and how they are implemented – support the achievement of the peace goals in practice.

Constructive alternatives to counter-terror 
Saferworld has carried out analysis of current counter-terror, stabilisation and statebuilding approaches. The analysis has examined alternatives to these current approaches that are more effective in building peace, less violent, and more focused on people. Saferworld has produced in-depth analyses of past counter-terror approaches in Afghanistan, Somalia and Yemen.

Funding 
Saferworld receives funding from a range of donors including governments, trusts and foundations and individuals.

Multilaterals 
 European Commission
 UN Trust Facility Supporting Cooperation on Arms Regulation (UNSCAR)

Governments 
 Canadian Ministry of Foreign Affairs
 Irish Aid
 Ministry of Foreign Affairs of Finland
 Ministry of Foreign Affairs of Denmark
 Royal Ministry of Foreign Affairs of the Netherlands
 Royal Swedish Ministry of Foreign Affairs
 Swedish International Development Cooperation Agency
 Swiss Agency for Development and Cooperation
 UK Department for International Development
 UK Foreign and Commonwealth Office
 USAID

Trusts and foundations 
 Humanity United
 Joseph Rowntree Charitable Trust
 Open Society Foundations

Others 
 Aide a la Decision Economique
 Coffey International
 DAI Global
 Economic & Social Research Council
 International Development Research Centre
 Netherlands Organisation for Scientific Research
 Oxford Policy Management
 Oxfam Novib
 PACT
 Pax Christi
 United States Institute of Peace
 World Vision

See also
 Peacebuilding
 Small arms trade
 Arms Trade Treaty

References

External links
 
 South Sudan: how conflict shapes life in local communities – in pictures
 Arms Trade Treaty enters into force offering fresh hope for the protection of civilians in 2015
 Bond NGO awards celebrate collaboration in complex times
 UK fuelling Yemen civil war with arms sales to Saudi Arabia, says Amnesty
 Saferworld on Twitter
 Saferworld on Facebook
 Saferworld's YouTube channel

Arms control
International nongovernmental organizations
International organisations based in London
Organizations established in 1989
Peace organisations based in the United Kingdom